Kaveri railway station is a railway station in Pallipalayam in Namakkal district of Tamil Nadu. It is also called Kaveri/Cauveri railway station or Cauvery RS. The name is obtained because of its proximity to the Kaveri River. It is also known officially by its code:CV.

It is situated in between Erode Junction railway station and Sankaridurg railway station (and Salem Junction) in the Chennai Central–Trivandrum section. It is located near the city of Erode, just 6 km from it.

It lies in the busy section of Chennai–Trivandrum in Salem railway division. Kaveri railway station is operated by the Chennai-headquartered Southern Railways of the Indian Railways. The station is used as shuttle station for Erode Junction.

All the passenger trains running between Erode Junction and Salem Junction will have a stop at here.

References

Railway stations in Namakkal district
Salem railway division